Elater abruptus is a species of click beetle in the genus Elater.

References

Elateridae
Beetles described in 1843